Gephyrophora is a genus of bryozoans belonging to the family Gigantoporidae.

The species of this genus are found in South African Republic, Australia, New Zealand.

Species:

Gephyrophora bilamellaria 
Gephyrophora polymorpha 
Gephyrophora rubra

References

Bryozoan genera